Glyptostoma gabrielense, commonly known as the San Gabriel chestnut or San Gabriel chestnut snail, is a species of air-breathing land snail in the family Megomphicidae. It is found in the San Gabriel Mountains, including in Angeles National Forest and San Gabriel Mountains National Monument, as well as lowlands in parts of the Los Angeles Basin.

References

Megomphicidae
Gastropods described in 1938